Frank Archibald Rhea (September 26, 1887 – October 31, 1963) was bishop of the Episcopal Diocese of Idaho, serving from 1942 to 1968.

Early life and education
Rhea was born on September 26, 1887, in Dixon, Missouri, the son of James Francis Rhea and Kathryn Milligan. He attended Sewanee Military Academy and later graduated from St Stephen's College in 1912. He enrolled at the Berkeley Divinity School, from where he graduated with a Bachelor of Sacred Theology in 1915. He was awarded a Doctor of Divinity from College of Idaho.

Ordination
Rhea was ordained deacon in 1915 and priest in 1916. He was appointed as priest in charge of the missions in Sisseton, South Dakota and chaplain of the army camps in the west of Texas. In 1918 he became rector of Trinity Church in Victoria, Texas while in 1919 he became in charge of the mission of the Incarnation in Texas. He transferred as rector of St Mark's Church in Beaumont, Texas in 1923, where he remained till 1928. In 1928 he was appointed Dean of St Michael's Cathedral in Boise, Idaho.

Episcopacy
Rhea was elected as missionary Bishop of Idaho in February 1942. He was consecrated on April 29, 1942, by Arthur Moulton, Bishop of Utah, in St Michael's Cathedral in Boise, Idaho. After retirement, Rhea served as pastor of Trinity Church in Seattle. He also acted as assistant bishop to the Bishop of Olympia. He retained his post till his retirement in 1957. Rhea died in his sleep on October 31, 1963.

Family
Rhea married Edith Hottenstein with whom he had four daughters. Upon her death he married Laura P. Wilson in 1936.

References

1887 births
1963 deaths
General Theological Seminary alumni
Episcopal bishops of Idaho
20th-century American Episcopalians
United States Army chaplains
Bard College alumni
Berkeley Divinity School alumni
People from Pulaski County, Missouri